Francis Stevens McAtamney  (15 May 1934 – 6 February 2022) was a New Zealand rugby union player. He was a member of the New Zealand national side, the All Blacks, in 1956 and 1957, playing in the prop position.

Early life
McAtamney was born in Middlemarch, New Zealand, and educated at St. Kevin's College, Oamaru where he played rugby for the school.

Senior rugby
McAtamney played for the Strath Taieri club and represented Otago (in the playing position of lock) from 1954 until 1957. He played for the South Island team in 1956 and was a New Zealand trialist in 1956 and 1957. He played in a New Zealand XV in 1955.

All Black
McAtamney had played for Otago as a lock but he was selected for the All Blacks in 1956 as a prop. He played against the Springboks in their 1956 tour and he was selected again in 1957 for the tour of Australia that year. In all he played nine matches for the All Blacks, including one international.

Death
McAtamney died on 6 February 2022, at the age of 87.

References

1934 births
2022 deaths
New Zealand international rugby union players
New Zealand rugby union players
People educated at St Kevin's College, Oamaru
Otago rugby union players
Rugby union props
Rugby union locks
Rugby union players from Otago
Deans family
Harper family